Le Bourdeix is a commune in the Dordogne department in southwestern France.

Population

See also
Communes of the Dordogne département

References

External links

 Bourdeix Le Bourdeix on the Quid site

Communes of Dordogne